Crazy People is a 1990 American black comedy film starring Dudley Moore and Daryl Hannah, directed by Tony Bill, and music by Cliff Eidelman.

Plot
Emory Leeson is an advertising executive who experiences a nervous breakdown. He designs a series of "truthful" advertisements, blunt and bawdy and of no use to his boss Drucker's firm.

One of his colleagues, Stephen Bachman, checks him into a psychiatric hospital. Emory goes into group therapy under the care of Dr. Liz Baylor and meets other voluntary patients, such as the lovely and vulnerable Kathy Burgess.  There is also George, who can speak only one word: "Hello."

By mistake, Emory's advertisements get printed and the new campaign turns out to be a tremendous success. Campaigns like: "Jaguar — For men who'd like hand jobs from beautiful women they hardly know." and "Volvo — they're boxy but they're good."

Drucker grabs credit for the ads.  He assigns Stephen and the rest of his employees to design similar new ad campaigns featuring so-called honesty in advertising, but nothing works.

Emory is approached in the sanitarium about creating new ads himself. He insists that his fellow mental patients also be involved and suitably rewarded for their work, transforming the sanitarium into a branch of the advertising industry.

They come up with wild advertising slogans, like one for a Greek travel agency that goes: "Forget Paris. The French can be annoying. Come to Greece.  We're nicer."  And another one called "Come... IN the Bahamas" for the islands' national tourism board.

The patients experience happiness at being needed and improve from their various illnesses. The evil Drucker and the doctor in charge of the hospital get greedy and try to separate the team.  But it doesn't work. Dr. Baylor defies her boss and Emory negotiates to get new automobiles for all of the patients. Emory and Kathy, who have fallen in love, leave the hospital in an army helicopter piloted by Kathy's long-lost brother, stopping to take the rest of the patients with them. They then open their own advertising agency, with Sony ("Sony - Because Caucasians are just too damn tall") as their first client.

Cast
 Dudley Moore as Emory Leeson
 Daryl Hannah as Kathy Burgess
 Paul Reiser as Stephen Bachman
 J. T. Walsh as Drucker
 Mercedes Ruehl as Dr. Baylor
 Alan North as Judge
 David Paymer as George
 Bill Smitrovich as Bruce
 Danton Stone as Saabs
 Paul Bates as Robles
 Dick Cusack as Mort
 Doug Yasuda as Hsu
 Floyd Vivino as Eddie Aris
 Ben Hammer as Dr. Koch
 David Packer as Mark Olander

Production
Mitch Markowitz was the initial director, but was fired 3 days into production and replaced by Tony Bill. John Malkovich was originally cast as Emory until he left during production. The movie's uncredited producer Sydney Pollack replaced Malkovich with Dudley Moore.

Reception
It received mostly negative reviews and has a rating of 35% on Rotten Tomatoes based on 20 reviews. Roger Ebert envisioned a call from the fictional Movie Police in his review:  Owen Gleiberman awarded the film a D- grade in one of Entertainment Weekly's earliest reviews. He stated:

Formats
The movie was released on VHS and Laserdisc (now out of print) in late 1990, and on widescreen DVD in 2004. The soundtrack featured the song "Don't Go Away Mad (Just Go Away)" by Mötley Crüe and the "Hello Song" performed by Floyd Vivino.

See also
 List of American films of 1990

References

External links
 
 
 

1990 films
1990s black comedy films
American black comedy films
American satirical films
Films about advertising
Films set in New York City
Films set in psychiatric hospitals
Paramount Pictures films
Films scored by Cliff Eidelman
1990 comedy films
Films directed by Tony Bill
1990s English-language films
1990s American films